South Carolina Highway 49 (SC 49) is a  primary state highway in the U.S. state of South Carolina. It is signed as a north–south highway, though it travels in a southwesterly–northeasterly direction, from Watts Mills to the North Carolina state line in Lake Wylie.

Route description

SC 49 is part of a three-state highway 49 (including North Carolina Highway 49 and Virginia State Route 49) that totals  from Watts Mills, South Carolina to Crewe, Virginia.

The portion in South Carolina runs  from Watts Mills to Lake Wylie.

History
Established in 1937 as a renumbering of SC 163, it traveled from U.S. Route 321 (US 321) in York to the North Carolina state line in Lake Wylie. In 1956, SC 49 was extended southwest to its current southern terminus at US 221 in Watts Mills replacing SC 91 from York to Monarch, SC 92 from Monarch to Cross Anchor, and SC 30 from Cross Anchor to Watts Mills.

In 1960 or 1961, SC 49 was rerouted from Lockhart to Mount Tabor. At an unknown date, SC 49 was rerouted north around downtown Union.

One previous SC 49 existed from around 1927–1935, from Myrtle Beach to the North Carolina state line in Little River. In 1932, most of SC 49 north of Myrtle Beach was replaced by US 117; by 1935, the rest of SC 49 (and US 117) was replaced by US 17.

Major intersections

Special routes

Union truck route

South Carolina Highway 49 Truck (SC 49 Truck) is a  truck route that bypasses a portion of West Main Street (SC 49) in western portions of Union. The first  of the highway travels along the two-lane Industrial Park Road, concurrent with the unsigned designation of SC 496. It then turns to the north-northwest along US 176/SC 18 Truck/SC 215 (Duncan Bypass) for its last .

Monarch Mill connector route

South Carolina Highway 49 Connector (SC 49 Conn.) is a  connector route along Monarch Highway between SC 215 southeast of Union to SC 49 in the census-designated place of Monarch Mill.

See also

References

External links

 
 SC 49 at Virginia Highways' South Carolina Highways Annex

049
Transportation in Laurens County, South Carolina
Transportation in Spartanburg County, South Carolina
Transportation in Union County, South Carolina
Transportation in Chester County, South Carolina
Transportation in York County, South Carolina